Korytné is a village and municipality in Levoča District in the Prešov Region of central-eastern Slovakia.

History
In historical records the village was first mentioned in 1297.

Genealogical resources

The records for genealogical research are available at the state archive "Statny Archiv in Levoca, Slovakia"

 Roman Catholic church records (births/marriages/deaths): 1669-1898 (parish B)

See also
 List of municipalities and towns in Slovakia

References

External links
https://web.archive.org/web/20090412234949/http://www.statistics.sk/mosmis/eng/run.html
Surnames of living people in Korytne

Villages and municipalities in Levoča District